Sir Charles Edmund Isham, 10th Baronet (16 December 1819 – 7 April 1903)  was an English landowner and gardener based at Lamport Hall, Northampton. He is credited with beginning the tradition of garden gnomes in the United Kingdom when he introduced a number of terracotta figures from Germany in the 1840s. Nicknamed "Lampy", the only gnome of the original batch to survive is on display at Lamport Hall and insured for £1 million.

Biography

Isham was educated at Rugby School and Brasenose College, Oxford. In 1846, on the death of his elder brother, he succeeded to the baronetcy.  He is recorded as being the High Sheriff of Northamptonshire in 1851.

In 1847, inspired by the writings of John Claudius Loudon, landscape gardener and horticulturalist, he commenced construction of a large rockery alongside his house. It was in this rockery that he first placed gnomes from Nuremberg as ornamentation.

Isham married Emily Vaughan, daughter of Sir John Vaughan and his wife Louisa Boughton on 26 October 1847. Emily died on 6 September 1898 aged 74.  Sir Charles had three daughters and no sons. The baronetcy, and the entailed estate including Lamport Hall, was inherited by Sir Vere Isham, 11th Baronet, his first cousin once removed.

Isham died at The Bungalow, Horsham, Sussex at the age of 83.

Isham Collection

In 1867 several extremely rare books and manuscripts were rediscovered in the library and loft of his family home. These included a fragment of Thomas Edwards' Cephalus and Procris; Narcissus which had been lost for 200 years and was the only existing part until a full copy was subsequently discovered at the Cathedral Library at Peterborough.

Also discovered were first editions of Milton's Paradise Lost and Paradise Regained in their original sheepskin bindings.

Further discoveries included:
Emaricdulfe (1598) by E.C. Esquire
Fidessa (1596) by Bartholomew Griffin
Laura (1597) by Robert Tofte
Cynthia (1598) by Richard Barnfield
for each of which only one or two other copies were known.  The above four works found their way into the Britwell Court Library before being sold in February 1922 to A.S.W. Rosenbach for £3,600.

Personal life

Isham was teetotal, vegetarian and a non-smoker. He opposed blood sports and enjoyed spending his time working on the rockery in his garden and looking after the employees on his estate.

Isham was a convinced spiritualist. He was a member of the British National Association of Spiritualists.

Publications

Sir Charles Isham on Spiritualism (1856)
A Lamport Garland From the Library of Sir Charles Edmund Isham (1881)

References

1819 births
1903 deaths
Alumni of Brasenose College, Oxford
Baronets in the Baronetage of England
English spiritualists
High Sheriffs of Northamptonshire